There Lived Kozyavin is an animation short directed by Andrei Khrzhanovsky, written by Lazar Lagin and Gennady Shpalikov.

Background

Andrey Khrzhanovskij directed this film in a surrealist, constructivist world, which resembles to the paintings by Giorgio de Chirico.

Plot

An employee, called Kozyavin, receives an assignment from his boss to find another employee called Sidorov. Without any questions, he soon left the office to search for Sidorov. Encountering traffic, he walked instead through sewer. He then arrived a wall, which was destroyed soon by a construction machine. There he met a builder and touched his shoulders. The builder turned to him and Kozyavin asked him, but he didn't hear anything he said close his ears. The builder took a little red flag from his suit and waved with it, until every builder stopped work, together with the machines. Kozyavin asked one more time, if he saw Sidorov. After a surprising action, he walked further to search for Sidorov. An active ramp in the building site, which worked intermittently up and down, didn't frighten up Kozyavin.

Without taking any break, Kozyavin continued to walk. On a fair, he walked upon a pole. The children, who were amazed about his acrobatic skills, were questioned by Kozyavin. After no reaction by them, the employee Kozyavin pursued his way with an optimistic view to comply with the task. The second person Kozyavin met was a violinist, who played a composition. Kozyavin asked the violinist if he saw Sidorov. Without any response, Kozyavin nudged him and took his violin bow. Walking on surrealistic stairs, he opened the door to a commission building.

Kozyavin sparked a light and went through paintings and antiques and finally saw two people, who looked like thieves. Kozyavin was oblivious that they were going to steal the items from this building. However, Kozyavin touched one of the man's shoulders and asked the same question as before. Surprised, they helped Kozyavin by giving directions to Sidorov.

Early next day he pursued the same direction. He entered a pipeline on the ground, in which curves were unrealistically smoothed by Kozyavin himself. He jumped from the pipeline onto the ground and trod on a dry veld. Determined to meet with Sidorov, Kozyavin went throughout the veld, until he climbed up to a mountain. With a good view, he watched everything around him. Unfortunately he didn't find anyone and continued to move forward. He arrived at a desert and got a view of a giant skeleton of a prehistoric animal. Walking through its backbone like a stair, he saw an archaeologist, who was researching the skeleton, and asked him the common question. With no reply and no regret about the destroyed skeleton by the archaeologist, Kozyavin continued walking. A body of stagnant water didn't block him to accomplish the task the boss gave him, so Kozyavin swam, until he reached Antarctica. Kozyavin walked around the world, until he arrived his office after failing to accomplish his boss's instruction to find Sidorov. Kozyavin answered it with a shrug and went back to his room.

References

External links
 

Soviet animated films
1966 television films
1966 films
Fictional Soviet people
Soviet television films
Soyuzmultfilm